What's in the Picture is an Australian television panel game show which aired on ABC from 1958 to 1959. Produced and broadcast live in Sydney, it was also shown in Melbourne via telerecordings, a type of recording also known as a kinescope recordings. The series was hosted by Harry Dearth, and aired in a half-hour time-slot.

Game play
A panel of celebrities were required to identify people and events from pictures shown on-screen.

Episode status
Although 16mm film prints ("telerecordings") were made of the live broadcasts so the series could be shown in Melbourne, it is not known if any of these still exist.

References

External links

1958 Australian television series debuts
1959 Australian television series endings
1950s Australian game shows
Australian live television series
Black-and-white Australian television shows
English-language television shows
Australian Broadcasting Corporation original programming
Australian panel games